Robert Austen (c. 1672 – c. August 1728) was an English politician. He was a Member of Parliament (MP) for Winchelsea from 1701 to 1702 and for Hastings from 1695 to 1698.

References

1670s births
1728 deaths
English MPs 1695–1698
English MPs 1701–1702